Antonovka is a rural locality (a village) and the administrative centre of Shevchenkovsky Selsoviet, Meleuzovsky District, Bashkortostan, Russia. The population was 443 as of 2010. There are 5 streets.

Geography 
Antonovka is located 20 km southwest of Meleuz (the district's administrative centre) by road. Ozerki is the nearest rural locality.

References 

Rural localities in Meleuzovsky District